Anapausa rugifrons is a species of beetle in the family Cerambycidae. It was described by Stephan von Breuning in 1951. It is known from Papua New Guinea.

References

Homonoeini
Beetles described in 1951